Willangie is a town in the 'Mallee' Ward of the Shire of Buloke, Victoria, Australia. It used to be called 'Lenrich'. The post office there opened in 1905, renamed 'Lenrich' on 9 March 1922, renamed back to Willangie on 10 September 1925 and was closed on 31 January 1931.

References

Shire of Buloke